Richard Hernán Schunke (born 26 November 1991) is an Argentine footballer who plays as a defender for Independiente del Valle.

Career

As a youth player, Schunke played as a goalkeeper, midfielder, and forward, before becoming a defender.

Schunke started his career with Argentine third division side Almagro, where he made 145 league appearances and scored 8 goals.

Before the 2018 season, he signed for Ecuadorian top flight side Independiente del Valle, helping them win the 2019 Copa Sudamericana.

References

External links
 
 

1991 births
Living people
Argentine footballers
Argentine people of German descent
Association football defenders
Ecuadorian Serie A players
Primera Nacional players
Primera B Metropolitana players
Club Almagro players
C.D. Cuenca footballers
C.S.D. Independiente del Valle footballers
Argentine expatriate footballers
Expatriate footballers in Ecuador
Sportspeople from Misiones Province
People from Posadas, Misiones